Bhante Vimalaramsi (born 1946) is an American Buddhist monk and currently the Abbot of the Dhamma Sukha Meditation Center in Annapolis, Missouri.

Biography
Born Marvel Logan, Bhante Vimalaramsi studied with Anagarika Munindra in 1977 and became a bhikkhu in Thailand in 1986 with further studies in Burma. He went to Burma in 1988 to practice intensive meditation at the famous meditation center Mahasi Yeiktha in Rangoon.

Bhante Vimalaramsi is a well known meditation teacher having taught in Malaysia and the United States. He has given retreats in Europe, Asia, SE Asia, and America. He is the founder of the American Forest Tradition and the Suttavada.

He uses the Majjhima Nikaya as his basis for teaching the "Mindfulness of Metta" and the Brahmaviharas that leads to the realization of Nibbana, which many of his students call Tranquil Wisdom Insight Meditation (T.W.I.M.).

Bhante Vimalaramsi founded the Dhamma Sukha Meditation Center  (DSMC) located in Iron County, Missouri. In 2006, for the first time in American history, a Buddhist ordination was held where an American woman (Sister Khanti-Khema) took the Samaneri (novice) vows with an American monk (Bhante Vimalaramsi) presiding, and this was done for the American Forest Tradition at the Dhamma Sukha Meditation Center.

On May 17, 2011, he was conferred the title of Sasana Tilakana, by The Supreme Sangha Council of Bangladesh. It was awarded for his intense work on preserving and teaching the Buddha Dhamma in the West.

US Representative to the World Buddhist Supreme Conference 

Bhante Vimalaramsi is the first American born monk who has been named as the first U.S. Representative to the World Buddhist Supreme Conference in Kobe, Japan.

As part of his new position he will coordinate U.S. representation at the Summit Conference to be held in Kobe, Japan in the Spring of 2007. The goal of the summit conferences is to bring together the many traditions of Buddhism in the world, and unify them to produce a united position dedicated to working towards balance, harmony, and world peace for mankind. The Conferences are scheduled to meet every two years.

Upon approval he was inaugurated into this lifetime position on November 1, 2008 in the New Royal Grand Hall of Buddhism in Japan.

Teachings: Suttavada 

In 1995 Bhante began to study the Sutta texts more thoroughly and he practiced meditation according to the Suttas. After a three-month self-retreat in a cave in Thailand, he wrote a book on the Mindfulness of Breathing called "The Ānāpānasati Sutta: A Practical Guide to Mindfulness of Breathing and Tranquil Wisdom Meditation". Today it is estimated that more than a million copies of this book are circulated worldwide in 12 languages. He claims in his book "Life is Meditation; Meditation is Life" (2014) that meditation will purify your mind in daily life.

Bhante Vimalaramsi teaches meditation directly from the Suttas of the Pali Canon. He considers the most workable English translation to be the work of Ven. Bhikkhu Bodhi and Ven. Nanamoli. Generally, Bhante Vimalaramsi places first emphasis on the Suttas and references the commentarial works only where they agree with the Suttas. He teaches by directly reading from the Suttas and expounding what they mean as he goes along. He follows the definitions and drills for meditation that were given by the Buddha to the original group of monks. Therefore, the meditation is taught with Samatha and Vipassana yoked together as advised by the Buddha in the texts.

T.W.I.M., Jhānas, and the Relax step 

Bhante Vimalaramsi has been teaching his meditation with a different approach, which is the Relax step and Tranquil/light Jhānas. A Sutta-based interpretation of meditation has led him to teaching what he calls "Tranquil Wisdom Insight Meditation (T.W.I.M.)", a joint Samatha/Vipassanā meditation. Bhante Vimalaramsi interprets the word ‘Samādhi’ as tranquillity, which signifies the same mental characteristics as Samatha.

This has been covered in a number of research papers and journals, below are the direct quotes with citations:Bhante Vimalaramsi suggests "it is far more important to observe what is happening in the mind than to sit with uncomfortable or painful sensations… There is no magic in sitting on the floor. The magic comes from a clear, calm mind." Bhante Vimalaramsi warns against the dangers of straining or forcing meditation, and the emotional disturbances and hardening of the mind that may ensue.I really got it! Whenever you try to focus your attention only on breathing and exclude other things—sound, delusive ideas etc., you will get stuffiness and tension in your body and mind, even if you are not aware of it.We would suggest following the Buddha’s advice to Ven. Soṇa and returning the approach to bring about harmony rather than stress or tension. Perhaps much can be learned from those like Ven. Vimalaramsi who are careful to avoid the extremes of too loose and too tight. T.W.I.M. aims to provide the meditator with a structure within which he or she can remain alert and aware, yet relaxed and open.

Tranquil / Light Jhānas 
Bhante Vimalaramsi teaches that Jhānas have only a light absorption. One can sense things happening around one while in these states; one can even do Jhānas while doing walking meditation. He teaches mainly from the Anapanasati Sutta and the Satipatthana Sutta, and maintains that Jhāna should not be considered as ecstatic or one-pointed (Ekaggatā). Rather, it is a light, relaxed state in which various Buddhist insights are examined.

The Six-R's 
When practitioners find that a distraction has taken their attention off this embodied feeling, they are instructed to use the Six-Rs. The Six-R process was developed from the earliest Buddhist texts by Bhante Vimalaramsi.

1. Recognize that a distraction has occurred.

2. Release the distraction by not continuing to think about it.

3. Relax any tension that may have arisen.

4. Re-smile.

5. Return to the embodied feeling (Object of Meditation).

6. Repeat this process as needed.

Bibliography

The Anapanasati Sutta: A Practical Guide to Mindfulness of Breathing and Tranquil Wisdom (1997-2006 editions)
Breath of Love (2012)
Moving Dhamma Volume 1 (2013
Life is Meditation, Meditation is Life (2014)
A Guide to Forgiveness Meditation (2015)
A Guide to Tranquil Wisdom Insight Meditation (T.W.I.M.) (2015)

Dhamma Leaf Series

MN 36  "The Greater Discourse to Saccaka"
MN 9    "Harmonious Perspective"
MN 148 "The 6 sets of 6"

References
 Citations

 Bibliography

External links 
 Publications by Bhante Vimalaramsi and students
 YouTube Channel
 The Relax Step
 Buddhist Mindfulness
 Bringing Metta to Daily Life
 The 6R's Technique

Theravada Buddhism writers
Converts to Buddhism
English Theravada Buddhists
Theravada Buddhist monks
American Theravada Buddhists
American Buddhist monks
Living people
Mindfulness (Buddhism)
1946 births